Skin and Other Stories is a collection of short stories written by Roald Dahl. It was published in 2000 by Puffin Books, a division of Penguin Putnam Books. Many of these stories first appeared in the Dahl book, Someone Like You, and also includes the story "The Surgeon", originally published in Playboy magazine in 1986.

Contents
"Skin"
"Lamb to the Slaughter"
"The Sound Machine"
"An African Story"
"Galloping Foxley"
"The Wish"
"The Surgeon"
"Dip in the Pool"
"The Champion of the World"
"Beware of the Dog" 
"My Lady Love, My Dove"

2000 short story collections
Short story collections by Roald Dahl